Ivan Ljubičić defeated Carlos Moyà 7–6(8–6), 6–2 to win the 2006 Chennai Open singles event. Moyà was the defending champion.

Seeds

  Ivan Ljubičić (champion)
  Radek Štěpánek (semifinals)
  Carlos Moyà (final)
  Paradorn Srichaphan (quarterfinals)
  Gilles Müller (quarterfinals)
  Rainer Schüttler (second round)
  Björn Phau (quarterfinals)
  Tomas Behrend (second round)

Draw

Finals

Section 1

Section 2

External links
 2006 Chennai Open Singles draw
 2006 Chennai Open Qualifying draw

Singles
Maharashtra Open